Myrciaria glanduliflora is a species of plant in the family Myrtaceae. It is endemic to Minas Gerais, Brazil, and was first described in 1975.

References

glanduliflora
Crops originating from the Americas
Crops originating from Brazil
Tropical fruit
Flora of South America
Endemic flora of Brazil
Fruits originating in South America
Cauliflory
Fruit trees
Berries
Plants described in 1975